South Suburban College is a public community college in South Holland, Illinois. It has a second campus in Oak Forest, Illinois.

History
South Suburban College was founded in 1927 as Thornton Junior College. At that time, the college was an extension of Thornton Township High School in Harvey, Illinois. The Illinois Community College Act of 1965 created Community College District 510 and enlarged the area served to include Thornton Township High Schools District 205, Thornton Fractional Township High School District 215, and Bremen High School District 228.

In 1969, the name was changed to Thornton Community College to emphasize the comprehensive mission of the college. The college moved into its existing main campus facilities in South Holland in 1972.

In June 1988, the college's board of trustees voted to change the name of the institution to South Suburban College to more accurately reflect the geographic location of the college. To serve the western portion of the district and provide opportunities for district residents to complete a four-year degree, the Oak Forest Center was opened in Oak Forest in 1992.

Campus 
The main campus is situated in South Holland, Illinois with a second campus, the Oak Forest Center located in Oak Forest, Illinois.

Athletics 
Men's Athletics
Basketball
Baseball
Soccer
Women's Athletics
Basketball
Soccer
Softball
Volleyball

Notable alumni
 Tom Baldwin - NFL player, New York Jets
 Tim Byrdak, Major League Baseball player
 Herb Coleman, American player of gridiron football
 Ruth Johnson Colvin, Founder of the non-profit Literacy Volunteers of America, Inc., now called ProLiteracy Worldwide in Syracuse, New York in 1962
 King Von, Rapper
 Cliff Floyd, Major League Baseball player
 Rob Mackowiak, Major League Baseball player
 Ron Mahay, Major League Baseball player 
 Julius Matos, Major League Baseball player 
 Robert P. Regan, Illinois state representative and businessman
 R. Bruce Waddell, Illinois state representative and businessman

References

External links 
 

 
Community colleges in Illinois
Educational institutions established in 1927
Oak Forest, Illinois
South Holland, Illinois
Universities and colleges in Cook County, Illinois
NJCAA athletics
1927 establishments in Illinois